Trofeo Franco Balestra is a road bicycle race held annually in Italy. It is organized as a 1.2 event on the UCI Europe Tour.

1977–2005: Memorial Sabbadini2006-      : Memorial Giampietro Metelli

Winners

References

External links
 2009 Trofeo Franco Balestra

UCI Europe Tour races
Cycle races in Italy
Recurring sporting events established in 1977
1977 establishments in Italy